Shibotovo is a rural locality (a village) in Nagornoye Rural Settlement, Petushinsky District, Vladimir Oblast, Russia. The population was 5 as of 2010. There are 6 streets.

Geography 
Shibotovo is located on the Dogadka Lake, 46 km northwest of Petushki (the district's administrative centre) by road. Sanino is the nearest rural locality.

References 

Rural localities in Petushinsky District